is an unstaffed railway station on the Sankō Line in Ōnan, Shimane, Japan, operated by West Japan Railway Company (JR West). Opened in 1975, this station closed on 31 March 2018 with the closure of the entire Sanko Line.

Lines
As of June 2009, the station was served by four trains in each direction daily.

Layout

The station consists of a single side platform serving a single track elevated approximately 30 m above ground level. Sole access to the platform is by a concrete staircase, with no lift or escalator.

Adjacent stations

History
The station opened on 31 August 1975. With the privatization of Japanese National Railways (JNR) on 1 April 1987, the station came under the control of JR West.

On 16 October 2015, JR West announced that it was considering closing the Sanko Line due to poor patronage. On 29 September 2016, JR West announced that the entire line would close on 31 March 2018. The line then closed on 31 March 2018, with an event hosted by JR West.

See also
 List of railway stations in Japan

References

External links

  

Railway stations in Shimane Prefecture
Stations of West Japan Railway Company
Railway stations in Japan opened in 1975
Railway stations closed in 2018